Jesse David Watts-Russell (1812 – 7 March 1879) was a British Conservative politician.

He was the son of Jesse Watts-Russell, an MP for Gatton and Mary Watts, and married Mary Nevill Wright, daughter of John Smith Wright and Lydia Gray, and had at least nine children, including Josephine (died ).

Watts-Russell was elected Conservative MP for North Staffordshire at the 1841 general election, and held the seat until 1852 when he stood down.

He was also, at some point, a Justice of the Peace.

References

External links
 

UK MPs 1841–1847
Conservative Party (UK) MPs for English constituencies
1812 births
1879 deaths
English justices of the peace